Gaëtan Robail (born 9 January 1994) is a French professional footballer who plays as a left winger for Super League Greece club Atromitos.

Career 
On 5 October 2020, Robail joined Guingamp on a season-long loan from Lens. On 12 January 2021, Robail moved to Valenciennes on 18-month loan deal with an option to sign permanently.

On 22 July 2022, Robail signed a two-year contract with Atromitos in Greece.

Career statistics

References

External links 

1994 births
Living people
French footballers
French expatriate footballers
Association football midfielders
Ligue 2 players
Championnat National 2 players
Challenger Pro League players
Ligue 1 players
Super League Greece players
Arras FA players
Paris Saint-Germain F.C. players
Cercle Brugge K.S.V. players
Valenciennes FC players
RC Lens players
En Avant Guingamp players
Atromitos F.C. players
French expatriate sportspeople in Belgium
Expatriate footballers in Belgium
French expatriate sportspeople in Greece
Expatriate footballers in Greece